Islam: A Short History is a 2000 book by the British writer Karen Armstrong, a former Roman Catholic nun and author of popular books about the history of religion. Armstrong condemns the West for being prejudiced about Islam since the Crusades, yet writing about present-day Muslims. Armstrong says that when they look at Western society, "they see no light, no heart, no spirituality." She writes in the preface, on Muslims:
Their chief duty was to create a just community in which all members, even the most weak and vulnerable, were treated with absolute respect. The experience of building such a society and living in it would give them intimations of the divine, because they would be living in accordance with God’s will.

References

2000 non-fiction books
British books
English-language books
History books about Islam
Works by Karen Armstrong